A referendum on the electoral system was held in Liechtenstein on 30 May 1935. Voters were asked whether they approved of introducing a system using proportional representation. The proposal was rejected by 52.7% of voters. Nevertheless, a proportional system was later adopted in 1939.

Results

References

1935 referendums
1935 in Liechtenstein
Referendums in Liechtenstein
Electoral reform referendums
Electoral reform in Liechtenstein
May 1935 events